Henidar-e Mafruzeh (also Romanized as Henīdar-e Mafrūz̤eh; also known as Henīdar-e Mafrāẕeh and Henīdar-e ‘Olyā) is a village in Howmeh-ye Sarpol Rural District, in the Central District of Sarpol-e Zahab County, Kermanshah Province, Iran. At the 2006 census, its population was 121, in 27 families.

References 

Populated places in Sarpol-e Zahab County